Kate Martinelli is the fictional lesbian detective featured in novelist’s Laurie R. King mysteries. The books are set in San Francisco, where Martinelli serves as a police officer with her partner, Alonzo Hawkin. The first book in the series, A Grave Talent, won an Edgar Award in 1994 for Best First Mystery Novel.

Books
A Grave Talent (1993)  
To Play the Fool (1995)  
With Child (1996)  
Night Work (2000)  
The Art of Detection (2006) 
Beginnings (2019)

References

Novels set in San Francisco
Detective novels
Fictional lesbians